"Pretty Young Girl" is a song by Bad Boys Blue from their debut album Hot Girls, Bad Boys. Released as a single in late 1985 and in the United States on December 30, 1986, it reached number 29 in West Germany, number 14 in Austria, and number 30 in Switzerland.

Composition 
The song was written and produced by Tony Hendrik and Karin Hartmann (as Karin van Haaren).

Charts

References 

1985 songs
1985 singles
Bad Boys Blue songs
Songs written by Tony Hendrik